Niumba is an online marketplace for arranging or offering lodging, primarily homestays. The website has 334,000 listings, 22% of which are located in Spain. 
It is a subsidiary of TripAdvisor.

History
Niumba was formed in 2005 by Grupo Intercom, a Barcelona based business incubator, with María José González-Barros as the co-founder.

In 2013, it was acquired by TripAdvisor.

References

External links

Tripadvisor
Spanish travel websites
Hospitality companies established in 2005
Real estate companies established in 2005
Internet properties established in 2005
Vacation rental
2005 establishments in Spain